"Hoy No Quiero" (English: "Today I Don't Want") is the third single from the singer rocker Mexican Julieta Venegas in her studio album Bueninvento. The song is nominated for Latin Grammy Award for Best Rock Song.

Song information
Was written and composed by Julieta Venegas, produced by Joe Chiccarelli, Emmanuel Del Real, Enrique Rangel of the Café Tacvba.

Music video
The video was recorded in Madrid, Spain. Venagas appears playing guitar and walking the streets of that city.

Track listing
CD single
"Hoy No Quiero" — 3:15

References

Julieta Venegas songs
2000 songs
Songs written by Julieta Venegas